Alaina Reed Hall (November 10, 1946 – December 17, 2009) was an American actress and singer who portrayed Olivia Robinson, Gordon's younger sister, on the PBS children's television series Sesame Street, and Rose Lee Holloway on the NBC sitcom 227.

Early years
In the mid-1960s, Reed attended Kent State University where she was active in many stage productions at KSU's E. Turner Stump Theater.  These included The Streets of New York, It's a Bird, It's a Plane, It's Superman! and The Tragedy of Tragedies — The Life and Death of Tom Thumb The Great.

During this time, Reed was the lead singer of Tiny and the Velours, a vocal group that performed regularly at Kent's popular student nightspot, The Fifth Quarter.

Career
Reed began her professional career in Philadelphia and off-Broadway productions. She was among the original cast members in the 1974 off-Broadway production of Sgt. Pepper's Lonely Hearts Club Band on the Road. Hall appeared in productions of Hair (Chicago in 1970 and the 1977 revival), Chicago, and Eubie!.

In 1976, she won the role of Olivia on the children's series Sesame Street. Her character was a photographer and the younger sister of Gordon. In 1985, she starred in the Sesame Street movie Follow That Bird, reprising her role as Olivia. That same year, Hall co-starred on the sitcom 227. For a time, she traveled between New York City (where Sesame Street is taped) and Los Angeles (where 227 was taped).  She left Sesame Street in 1988.

After 227 ended in 1990, Hall appeared in guest roles on various TV shows, including Herman's Head and Blossom. She also provided the voice for animated characters on Where on Earth Is Carmen Sandiego?. In 1995, Hall co-starred on the short-lived WB sitcom Cleghorne!, starring Ellen Cleghorne. The following year, she appeared in the television film The Cherokee Kid. She also had recurring roles on Ally McBeal, Any Day Now, and ER.

In addition to stage and television work, Hall also appeared in roles in feature films including Death Becomes Her (1992), Cruel Intentions (1999), and the 2007 independent feature I'm Through with White Girls (The Inevitable Undoing of Jay Brooks).

Personal life
She was married three times and had two children.

Her first marriage was to Richard Cook, with whom she had two children. The marriage ended in divorce.

In December 1988, Reed married actor Kevin Peter Hall. She met Hall when he was a guest performer on 227. Hall died in April 1991 of complications from AIDS-related pneumonia. Hall had contracted HIV after receiving a contaminated blood transfusion during surgery for injuries he sustained in a car accident a year prior.

In 2008, Hall married Tamim Amini. They were married until her death.

Death
Hall died of breast cancer at Saint John's Health Center in Santa Monica, California on December 17, 2009 at the age of 63. She was cremated, and her ashes were scattered at the Pacific Ocean off the Hilo Bay Island waters by her husband Tamim Amini.

Filmography

References

External links
 
  (archive)
 

American musical theatre actresses
American television actresses
American voice actresses
Capitol Records artists
Deaths from cancer in California
Deaths from breast cancer
People from Greater Los Angeles
2009 deaths
African-American actresses
American film actresses
American stage actresses
20th-century American singers
20th-century African-American women singers
20th-century American women singers
20th-century American actresses
21st-century American actresses
Kent State University alumni
1946 births
21st-century African-American women
21st-century African-American people
People from Springfield, Ohio
Actresses from Ohio
Singers from Ohio